Kostanay is a district of Kostanay Region in eastern Kazakhstan. The administrative center of the district is the urban-type settlement of Tobyl. Population:

Notable residents
Aleksandra Klimova (19212005), actress
Ivan Pavlov (19221950), aviator

References

Districts of Kazakhstan
Kostanay Region